The Perth Pelicans are an Australian junior ice hockey team based in Perth, Western Australia playing in the Australian Junior Ice Hockey League. They represent one of the two junior ice hockey teams from Western Australia currently playing in the AJIHL, which is the most elite level for ice hockey at a national level for ages between 16–20 years old.

History
Tryouts for the new Perth Pelicans team began on 2 September 2014 with a mandatory fitness assessment, held on 2 September 2014 at Kingsway Christian College for 8pm, and 2 ice sessions.

The Perth Pelicans played their first Australian Junior Ice Hockey League game on Monday October 21, 2013 against the Perth Sharks. The Pelicans team included national draft player Liam Hall from Queensland.

The first team
The players from the first game the Perth Pelicans played in their inaugural season in the Australian Junior Ice Hockey League, October 21, 2013.

For the 2013–14 AJIHL season

Players

Current roster
For the 2015–16 AJIHL season

Captains
 2013-14 Tom Smail (C)
 2014-15 Kieren Webster (C), Rhys Dumpleton (A), Ryan Smith (A)
 2015-16 Jordan Grover (C), Jordan Williams (A), David Mahood (A)

Head coaches
The first Head Coach for the Perth Pelicans was Darin Bryce.

 2013-14 Darin Bryce
 2014-15 Darin Bryce
 2015-16 Darin Bryce

See also

Australian Junior Ice Hockey League
Melbourne Glaciers
Melbourne Whalers
Perth Sharks
Sydney Sabres
Sydney Wolf Pack
Ice Hockey Australia
Ice Hockey New South Wales
Australian Women's Ice Hockey League
Australian Ice Hockey League
Jim Brown Trophy
Goodall Cup
Joan McKowen Memorial Trophy

References

Australian Junior Ice Hockey League
Ice hockey teams in Australia
Ice hockey clubs established in 2013
Sporting clubs in Perth, Western Australia
2013 establishments in Australia